The 1918 United States Senate election in Colorado took place on November 5, 1918. It was the second direct U.S. Senate election in Colorado following the ratification of the Seventeenth Amendment, and the first for the Class 2 Senate seat. Democratic Senator John F. Shafroth ran for re-election to a second term, and was opposed by Denver businessman Lawrence C. Phipps, the Republican nominee, in the general election. As Republicans made gains nationwide, they performed well in Colorado, too, and Phipps unseated Shafroth by a thin margin.

Democratic primary

Candidates

Declared
 John F. Shafroth, incumbent U.S. Senator

Results

Republican primary

Candidates
 Lawrence C. Phipps, Denver businessman, President of the Colorado Taxpayers Protective League
 Charles W. Waterman, Denver attorney

Results

General election

Results

References

1918
Colorado
United States Senate